Nessa Cohen, born Helen Nessa Cohen, (December 11, 1885 - December 1976) was an American sculptor, born in New York City. She exhibited in the 1913 International Exhibition of Modern Art.

Early life

Cohen was born on December 11, 1884 in New York City. Her parents were Pauline and Adolph Cohen, who were both of German and Russian heritage. Her father was a lawyer born in Germany. She had an older sister named Sadie.

Education
A graduate of Barnard College, Cohen studied sculpture with James Earle Fraser at the Art Students League and at the Cooper Union. She also studied with Despiau and Charles Malfray in Paris.

Career
Before 1913 the American Museum of Natural History provided monies to Cohen so that she and other artists could travel to the southwest to study individuals from six Native American tribes to capture their clothes and features. The resulting works included Sunrise. The sketches that she presented to the museum so that they could assess her skills before sending her to the southwest resulted in the Hopi Relay Runner.<ref>[http://xroads.virginia.edu/~museum/armory/primitivism.html I Prefer the Navajo Rug: Locating an American Primitive] . The Museum of American Studies. University of Virginia. Retrieved February 7, 2014.</ref>

Cohen showed three pieces at the 1913 International Exhibition of Modern Art in New York, two plaster pieces Age and Portrait and the bronze Sunrise.Sunrise was also exhibited at the 1916 Annual American Exhibition in Chicago, as was the bronze The Velvet Cap, Joy and Card tray: Hospitality.

She was a member of the National Sculpture Society and exhibited a piece, Moment Musicale in the society's 1923 show.  Cohen was also a member of the National Association of Women Painters and Sculptors, New York Architectural League and the Society of Independent Artists. Her work was also part of the sculpture event in the art competition at the 1928 Summer Olympics.

She traveled to Italy and France.

Death
Cohen died in December, 1976. She donated funds to the Art Students League of New York for the Nessa Cohen Memorial Fund for art students' housing, education and travel expenses.Schoolhouse Partners LLC. Directory of Research Grants 2008. AuthorHouse; May 2008. . p. 87.

Works

 Age, plaster
 Card tray: Hospitality Group of Indians of Southwestern United States, American Museum of Natural History.
 Joy Navajo Watching Women at Work Portrait, plaster
 Sunrise, bronze, Havana, Cuba
 The Velvet Cap''

References

1880s births
1976 deaths
American women sculptors
20th-century American sculptors
20th-century American women artists
National Association of Women Artists members
Society of Independent Artists
Olympic competitors in art competitions